Drilliola reevii is a species of sea snail, a marine gastropod mollusk in the family Borsoniidae.

Description
The size of the shell varies between 8 mm and 13.5 mm. The shell is multicarinate. The interstices are longitudinally striate. The color of the shell is pale violaceous or whitish, sometimes indistinctly fasciated with a darker color above. The columella is one- or two-plaited. The outer lip is acute, crenulated, and shows a slight sinus.

Distribution
This species occurs in the Red Sea and the Persian Gulf; and off Indonesia, New Guinea and the Philippines

References

 Kilburn, R.N. (1986) Turridae (Mollusca: Gastropoda) of southern Africa and Mozambique. Part 3. Subfamily Borsoniinae. Annals of the Natal Museum, 27, 633–720 page(s): 715
 Poppe, G.T. & Tagaro, S.P. (2021). New Borsoniidae from the Central Philippines. Gloria Maris. 60(4): 188-207

External links
 
 Adams, C. B. (1850). Notes on the synonymy of certain marine shells. Contributions to Conchology. 4: 54-55
 Hinds, R. B. (1843). On new species of Pleurotoma, Clavatula, and Mangelia. Proceedings of the Zoological Society of London. (1843) 11: 36-46.

reevii
Gastropods described in 1850